"Roll On" is the fourth single from Kid Rock's triple-platinum album Rock n Roll Jesus. It was shipped to radio on September 23, 2008. The song failed to chart in the United States. In Germany it peaked at No. 59. The video of the song was very successful on the VH1 weekly Top 20 countdown, peaking at No. 4.

Track listings

 Roll On
 Rock N Roll Pain Train
 Cocky ( UK Single)

Content
The song deals with Kid Rock coming to terms with himself aging and talks of enjoying the time he has left with his family. It is an acoustic country ballad with gospel vocals provided by Jessica Wagner. The song also includes a saxophone solo by David McMurray.

Critical reception
Billboard described the song as "a soulful high-water mark", and it has also been described as "Motown-influenced".

Music video
The music video was shot for it in August 2008 in Detroit, including at the Motown Historical Museum. The video features landmarks such as Tiger Stadium, Comerica Park, Lafayette Coney Island and the Uniroyal Giant Tire near Interstate 94. Kid Rock said, with respect to the video, that he "really wanted to capture the heart and soul of Detroit."

Chart performance

References

2008 singles
Kid Rock songs
Songs written by Kid Rock
Music videos directed by Deaton-Flanigen Productions
2008 songs
Atlantic Records singles